Ussara ancobathra is a species of sedge moth in the genus Ussara. It was described by Edward Meyrick in 1932. It is found in Brazil.

References

Moths described in 1932
Glyphipterigidae